Renesmee is a feminine given name created by author Stephenie Meyer for a character in Breaking Dawn, the fourth novel in the Twilight series. It is a combination of the names Renee and Esmé. The name, along with others used in the series, came into use due to the popularity of the books and movies. Alternate spellings of the name are also in use.

In 2012, Meyer said "I would never name a real child Renesmee."

Notes

Feminine given names
English given names invented by fiction writers
Portmanteaus
Twilight (novel series)